Richard Clifford (died 1421) was a Bishop of London who had previously been Bishop of Worcester, Bishop-elect of Bath and Wells, and Lord Privy Seal.

Clifford's brother was the politician Robert Clifford, who was member of parliament (MP) first for Northumberland and later for Kent.

Clifford was appointed Lord Privy Seal on 14 November 1397 and resigned on 4 November 1401. He was Keeper of the Great Wardrobe from 1390 to 1398.

Clifford was elected to the see of Bath and Wells on 12 May 1400, but not consecrated, as he was instead translated to the see of Worcester. Clifford was elected to the see of Worcester on 19 August 1401 and consecrated on 9 October 1401.

Clifford was translated to the see of London on 22 June 1407. He planned to found a college of the University of Oxford which he intended to name London College. However, he died on 20 August 1421 and his plan did not survive him.

Citations

References

External links
 

Year of birth unknown
1421 deaths
14th-century births
15th-century English Roman Catholic bishops
Bishops of Bath and Wells
Bishops of London
Bishops of Worcester
Deans of York
Lords Privy Seal